What Lies Beneath is a 2000 American supernatural horror thriller film directed by Robert Zemeckis and starring Harrison Ford and Michelle Pfeiffer as a couple who live in a haunted house. It was the first film by Zemeckis' production company ImageMovers. The film opened in 2,813 theaters in North America, and grossed $291 million at the worldwide box office, becoming the tenth-highest-grossing film of the year. It received mixed reviews, but was nominated for three Saturn Awards. Bollywood made a 2002 remake of this film named Raaz.

Plot
Former cellist Claire Spencer and her husband Norman, an accomplished scientist and professor, live a quiet life in Vermont. Their relationship seems slightly strained, particularly after Claire's daughter, Caitlin, leaves for college. Claire notices the new neighbors, Mary and Warren Feur, appear to have a volatile relationship. After Mary is unseen for several days, Claire suspects Warren may have killed her.

While by the lake next to their house, Claire believes she sees a woman's body in the water. She later discovers an odd key inside a heater vent. After unusual occurrences and sensing a presence in the house, Claire and her mystic friend, Jody, hold a failed séance. Claire later finds the bathtub filled with hot water and, "You know," written on the steamy mirror. Claire's computer inexplicably types "MEF" repeatedly. Claire becomes convinced it is the missing Mary's spirit, but Norman discounts this. Several days later, Mary returns home alive and well, explaining she went to her mother's in Providence after a fight with Warren.

A framed newspaper article about Norman mysteriously falls off his desk and shatters. On the article's reverse side, Claire reads a piece about a missing woman named Madison Elizabeth Frank ("MEF"). Claire tracks down and visits Madison's mother, who shows her Madison's bedroom. While there, Claire steals a lock of Madison's hair, and notices a photo of her wearing an unusual necklace.

Later that night, Claire, holding Madison's hair, performs a ritual from a book. She conjures Madison, whose spirit possesses her. While still possessed, Claire aggressively seduces Norman. Madison, speaking through Claire, shocks Norman. Claire, dropping the lock of hair, immediately becomes herself again. She then recalls a repressed memory about Norman's affair with a student. Norman admits it happened during a rough patch in their marriage. Claire leaves and spends the night with Jody, who reveals that a year earlier, she saw Norman arguing with a blonde woman at a café in Adamant, a nearby town.

Claire returns home and finds Norman unconscious in the tub. He seemingly recovers and claims it was an accident and not a suicide attempt. He denies killing Madison. Norman later finds Claire standing on the lake dock. Claire, holding Madison's hair, is pulled into the water by an unseen force. Dragged to the bottom, she sees a jewelry box with the same symbol as Madison's necklace. Before she can grab it, Norman has jumped in and pulls her to the surface. They then burn the lock of hair.

Claire later visits a shop in Adamant, where she sees a jewelry box with the same design as the one in the lake. Claire recovers the box from the lake and unlocks it with the key she previously found. Inside is Madison's necklace. Norman changes his story, claiming Madison killed herself in their house. He says he pushed her car into the lake with her body inside. Norman agrees to confess to authorities, but Claire discovers he dialed 411, and faked the conversation. Norman paralyzes Claire with halothane, and admits he murdered Madison when she threatened to expose their affair to the dean.

Norman places Claire in the bathtub, filling it with water to stage her suicide. He spots Madison's necklace around Claire's neck. When Claire's face seems to contort into Madison's corpse, Norman jerks back and smashes his head on the bathroom sink, rendering him unconscious. As the water level rises, Claire recovers enough from the paralysis to partially close the tap and then dislodge the stopper, barely surviving drowning. Norman has left the bathroom and she finds him seemingly unconscious downstairs. She flees in the couple's truck. As she crosses the bridge over Lake Champlain, Norman, hiding in the truck bed, attacks Claire, who frantically dials 911 on her cell phone. The truck careens down the embankment into the lake. As it sinks, it dislodges Madison's car. Madison's body floats toward the couple as Norman tries to drown Claire. Madison grabs Norman's arm, shocking him, which allows Claire to escape. Norman drowns and Madison's ghost drifts away. Later that winter, Claire places a red rose on Madison's grave.

Cast
Harrison Ford as Dr. Norman Spencer, a successful college professor and scientist. 
Michelle Pfeiffer as Claire Spencer, Norman's wife. 
Diana Scarwid as Jody, a mystic and Claire's best friend.
Miranda Otto as Mary Feur, Norman and Claire's neighbor.
James Remar as Warren Feur, Norman and Claire's neighbor and Mary's husband.
Katharine Towne as Caitlin Spencer, Claire's daughter and Norman's stepdaughter.
Ray Baker as Dr. Stan Powell
Joe Morton as Dr. Drayton, a therapist whom Claire visits upon Norman's urging.
Amber Valletta as Madison Elizabeth Frank, a murdered young woman with whom Norman has had an affair.
Wendy Crewson as Elena

Production
Documentary filmmaker Sarah Kernochan had adapted a personal experience with the paranormal as a script treatment featuring a retirement aged couple dealing with restless but compassionate spirits. DreamWorks commissioned a rewrite from actor-writer Clark Gregg. This script was later delivered in 1998 by Steven Spielberg himself to his director friend Robert Zemeckis, who had signed a deal for DreamWorks to distribute the films of newly founded production company ImageMovers, and announced interest in doing a thriller film. Harrison Ford then signed to star on the film, even agreeing to clear room in his schedule for the project. Michelle Pfeiffer then followed as DreamWorks started to deal with 20th Century Fox regarding the film's distribution. Ford and Pfeiffer were Zemeckis' first and only choices for the lead roles. Fox agreed to distribute both What Lies Beneath and Zemeckis' other project Cast Away,  with the thriller having DreamWorks doing the domestic distribution and Fox the international one.

Zemeckis filmed What Lies Beneath while Cast Away was shut down to allow Tom Hanks to lose weight and grow a beard for his character's development. As Gregg had to remain with production for rewrites, he had to decline Aaron Sorkin's offer to read for a major role in Sports Night - though Sorkin would later write for Gregg a minor role in the final episodes of the series.

Reception

Box office
What Lies Beneath opened in 2,813 theaters in North America and grossed $29,702,959 for an average of $10,559 per theater. It reached the number one spot at the box office upon opening, beating X-Men. The film ended up earning $155,464,351 domestically and $135,956,000 internationally for a total of $291,420,351 worldwide, close to triple its production budget of $100 million.

Critical response
On Rotten Tomatoes the film holds an approval rating of 47% based on 126 reviews, with an average rating of 5.50/10. The site's critics consensus reads: "Robert Zemeckis is unable to salvage an uncompelling and unoriginal film." Metacritic assigned the film a weighted average score of 51 out of 100, based on 35 critics, indicating "mixed or average reviews". Audiences polled by CinemaScore gave the film an average grade of "B+" on an A+ to F scale.

The New York Times wrote that, "at the start, [Zemeckis] zaps us with quick, glib scares, just to show he still knows how, but his heart isn't in this kind of material anymore. His reflexes are a little slow." The Los Angeles Times called it "spooky with a polished kind of creepiness added in... What Lies Beneath nevertheless feels more planned than passionate, scary at points but unconvincing overall." Roger Ebert awarded the film 2 out of 4 stars, writing for the Chicago Sun-Times: "Lacking a smarter screenplay, it milks the genuine skills of its actors and director for more than it deserves, and then runs off the rails in an ending more laughable than scary. Along the way, yes, there are some good moments." Time Out thought that, "after a slow build that at times makes every hair stand on endZemeckis rolls out every thriller cliché there is. A pity, because until then it's a smart, realistically staged, adult-oriented and extraordinarily effective domestic chiller." Empire wrote: "The biggest surprise is, perhaps, that what emerges is no masterpiece, but a semi-sophisticated shocker, playfully homaging Hitchcock like a mechanical masterclass in doing 'genre'. The first hour is great fun... It's an enjoyably giddy ride, certainly, but once you're back from the edge of your seat, you realise most of the creaks and groans are from the decomposing script."

Michelle Pfeiffer received some positive notice for her performance. Roger Ebert called her "convincing and sympathetic."

In his review, Ebert said that he felt the problem with Zemeckis' desire to direct a Hitchcockian film (What Lies Beneath contains several musical, visual and plot references to Psycho and Vertigo, among other Hitchcock films) was Zemeckis' decision to involve the supernatural, a device Ebert felt Alfred Hitchcock himself would never have done.

Accolades

See also
List of ghost films

References

External links

2000 horror films
2000 thriller films
2000 thriller drama films
2000s American films
2000s ghost films
2000 psychological thriller films
2000s psychological horror films
2000s supernatural films
American thriller drama films
American ghost films
American haunted house films
American psychological horror films
American supernatural horror films
2000s English-language films
Films about amnesia
Films about scandalous teacher–student relationships
Films set in Vermont
Films shot in Vermont
Adultery in films
Films scored by Alan Silvestri
Films produced by Robert Zemeckis
Films directed by Robert Zemeckis
DreamWorks Pictures films
20th Century Fox films
ImageMovers films